The Liberty Korea Party was a conservative political party in South Korea that was described variously as right-wing, right-wing populist, or far-right. Until February 2017, it was known as the Saenuri Party, and before that as the Hannara Party from 1997 to 2012, both of which are still colloquially used to refer to the party. The party formerly held a plurality of seats in the 20th Assembly before its ruling status was transferred to the Democratic Party of Korea on 27 December 2016, following the creation of the splinter Bareun Party by former Saenuri members who distanced themselves from President Park Geun-hye in the 2016 South Korean political scandal.

In February 2020, the Liberty Korea Party merged with Onward for Future 4.0 and the New Conservative Party, launching the United Future Party to contest the 2020 South Korean legislative election.

History

1997: Foundation of Grand National party

The party was founded in 1997, when the United Democratic Party and New Korea Party merged.

Its earliest ancestor was the Democratic Republican Party under the authoritarian rule of Park Chung-hee in 1963. On Park's death, and at the beginning of the rule of Chun Doo-hwan in 1980, it was reconstituted and renamed as the Democratic Justice Party. In 1988, party member Roh Tae-woo introduced a wide range of political reforms including direct presidential elections and a new constitution.

The party was renamed in 1993, during the presidency of Kim Young-sam, with the merger of other parties to form the Democratic Liberal Party (Minju Jayudang). It was renamed as the New Korea Party (Sinhangukdang) in 1995, and it then became the Grand National Party in November 1997 following its merger with the smaller United Democratic Party and various conservative parties.

1998–2007: Lost ten years

Three months later, in 1998, with the election of Kim Dae-jung of the National Congress for New Politics as president, the conservative party's governing role came to an end, and it began its first ever period in opposition, which would last ten years. In October 2012, the Advancement Unification Party merged with the Saenuri Party.

Following the 2000 parliamentary elections, it was the single largest political party, with 54% of the vote and 133 seats out of 271. The party continued to control the National Assembly.

The party was defeated in the parliamentary election in 2004 following the attempted impeachment of President Roh Moo-hyun, gaining only 121 seats out of 299. The party's defeat reflected public disapproval of the attempted impeachment, which was instigated by the party. This was the first time in its history the party had not won the most seats. It gained back five seats in by-elections, bringing it to 127 seats as of 28 October 2005.

2008–2012: Recovering position of the ruling party and Lee Myung-bak government
On 19 December 2007, the GNP's candidate, former Seoul mayor Lee Myung-bak won the presidential election, ending the party's ten-year period in opposition.

In the April 2008 general election, the GNP secured a majority of 153 seats out of 299 and gained power in the administration and the parliament as well as most local governments, despite low voter turnout.

One of the main bases of popular support of the party originates from the conservative, traditionalist elite and the rural population, except for farmers. It is strongest in the Gyeongsang region. Former party head, and 2007 presidential candidate, Park Geun-hye is the daughter of former President Park Chung-hee who ruled from 1961 to 1979. Although Representative Won Hee-ryeong and Hong Jun-pyo ran for the party primary as reformist candidates, former Seoul mayor and official presidential candidate Lee Myung-bak gained more support (about 40%) from the Korean public.

The GNP suffered a setback in the 2010 local elections, losing a total of 775 local seats throughout the counties, but remained with the most seats in the region.

GNP-affiliated politician, Oh Se-hoon, lost his mayoral position in Seoul after the Seoul Free Lunch Referendum.

The Grand National Party celebrated its 14th anniversary on 21 November 2011, amid uncertainties from intra-party crises.

The DDoS attacks during the October 2011 by-election have become a central concern of the GNP as it could potentially disintegrate the party leadership.

2012–2016: Renaming to Saenuri Party and Park Geun-hye government

Emergency Response Commission
The Hong Jun-pyo leadership system collapsed on 9 December 2011, and the GNP Emergency Response Commission was launched on 17 December 2011, with Park Geun-hye as commission chairperson, to prepare for the forthcoming Legislative Election 2012 on 11 April 2012, and the Presidential Election 2012 on 19 December 2012.

There was a debate with Commission members about whether to transform the Grand National Party into a non-conservative political party or not, but Park said the GNP would never become non-conservative and will follow the real values of conservatism.

2016–2019: 2016 South Korean political scandal and impeachment
The party's leader and South Korean President Park Geun-hye was impeached and convicted for her role in a corruption scandal.

Dissolution
The Liberty Korea Party merged with Onward for Future 4.0 and the New Conservative Party on 17 February, launching the United Future Party in time for the upcoming 2020 South Korean legislative election.

Official color
In February 2012, the party changed its political official color from blue to red. This was a change from the previous 30 years where blue was usually the symbol of the conservative parties.

Policy

The party supports free trade and neoliberal economic policies. It favors maintaining strong cooperation with the United States and Japan It also believes that each Korean first level province needs to have a sustainable economy. The party is also conservative on social issues such as opposition to legal recognition of same-sex couples. The party supports equality between man and woman, as quoted, "and ensure that both men and women are equally guaranteed opportunities"

Four major rivers project
One of the party's important policies is to financially secure The Four Major Rivers Project since President Lee Myung-bak was in office. This project's budget disputes have sparked controversial political motions in the National Assembly for three consecutive years.

Sejong City project
The party has been less inclined toward the creation of a new capital city for South Korea, to be called Sejong City than the previous administration. As of 2012, the Saenuri Party has indicated that some governmental offices will be relocated to the new city, but not all.

Human rights activism
The party has been very active in promoting the North Korean Human Rights Law, which would officially condemn the use of torture, public executions and other human rights violations in North Korea.

Party representative Ha Tae Kyung is the founder of Open Radio for North Korea, an NGO dedicated to spreading news and information about democracy, to which citizens of North Korea have little access due to their government's isolationist policies. In April 2012, Saenuri member Cho Myung-Chul became the first North Korean defector elected to the National Assembly. In spring 2012, several Saenuri representatives took part in the Save My Friend protests, organized to oppose China's policy of repatriating North Korean defectors, and expressed their solidarity with Park Sun-young's hunger strike.

Controversy

Online sockpuppetry
The party has records of secretly hiring and paying university students to generate online replies favorable to the GNP. GNP member Jin Seong-ho formally apologized on 2 July 2009, for making a remark that "the GNP occupied Naver," one of the biggest South Korean internet portals.

8 December 2010, controversial bill-passing
The party passed a bill relating to the year 2011 national budget without the opposition parties' input on 8 December 2010. It had caused legislative violence before. This process of passing the budget bill sparked controversy over potential illegality. Due to this incident, many South Korean political, academic and citizen groups expressed their outrage against current mainstream politics. The reason for forceful passing of the bill was due mainly to the budget disputes over the controversial Four Major Rivers Project.  Many Buddhists in South Korea criticized the budget bill for neglecting the national Temple Stay program. This has led the Jogye Order, the largest Buddhist order in South Korea, to sever ties with the GNP and becoming financially independent without any funding from the government. The interns and the staff working in the National Assembly officially complained on 17 December that their salary was unpaid after the passing of this bill.

Views of Individual Party Members
Certain members of the Liberty Korea Party have faced criticism for expressing anti-refugee, homophobic views and advocacy of authoritarian rules of the October Restoration.

List of leaders

Chairpersons
 Note
 - as head of Emergency Response Committee
* - as the de facto head of party

Assembly leaders (Floor leaders)

Election results

President

Legislature

Local

Party splits
 Saenuri Party (2017) (2017-since)
 Korean Patriots' Party (2017-since)

See also

 Impeachment of Park Geun-hye
 2016 South Korean legislative election
 2017 South Korean presidential election
 2018 South Korean local elections
 2019 South Korean Capitol attack

Notes

References

External links

 
Right-wing populism in South Korea
Anti-communism in South Korea
National conservative parties
Social conservative parties
Conservative parties in South Korea
Right-wing populist parties
Far-right politics in South Korea
Anti-communist parties
Discrimination against LGBT people in South Korea
Right-wing parties
Right-wing politics in South Korea
1997 establishments in South Korea
International Democrat Union member parties
Political parties established in 1997
2020 disestablishments in South Korea
Political parties disestablished in 2020
Defunct nationalist parties